Berthold Albrecht (14 August 1954 in Essen – 21 November 2012 in Chur) was a German businessman and one of Germany's wealthiest men. He was co-owner (with his brother Theo Albrecht Jr.) of the Aldi Nord chain of discount supermarkets, which they inherited the company from their father, Theo Albrecht, upon his death in July 2010.

Albrecht was the chairman of the Markus Foundation. Additionally,  addition, he owned Weba-Holding GmbH.

Personal
His uncle, Karl Albrecht, owned Aldi Süd and was Germany's wealthiest person up until his death in 2014.

Berthold and his wife, Babette Albrecht, had three daughters and one son. The latter, Nicolay Albrecht, accused his mother and three sisters of embezzling money from the family trust in September 2020.

References

1954 births
2012 deaths
German billionaires
Businesspeople from Bremen (state)
German businesspeople in retailing
20th-century German businesspeople
21st-century German businesspeople
Businesspeople from Essen
Deaths from cancer in Germany
Aldi people